Chai Wan Park is one of the largest parks in Hong Kong. Located in Chai Wan of Hong Kong near Chai Wan station, it occupies 6.55 hectares. Completed by Urban Council on 21 April 1993, the park is now managed by Leisure and Cultural Services Department, a department of Hong Kong Government.

History
The park was the former site of Chaiwan Campsite of The Boy Scouts Association, Hong Kong Branch (present-day The Scout Association of Hong Kong) in 1929. The hill in the site thus known as Tung Kwan Shan in Cantonese. In 1970, the Government decided to develop Chai Wan and the associate returned the site to the government and got a site in Tai Tam in exchange. The hill was demolished in the 1980s and the shore nearby was reclaimed for the construction of the park.

The park was opened on 21 April 1993.

Facility
The park has a lily pond in the middle.

See also
List of urban public parks and gardens in Hong Kong

References

Urban public parks and gardens in Hong Kong
Chai Wan